Eremochloa is a genus of Asian and Australian plants in the grass family.

 Species
 Eremochloa attenuata Buit. - Thailand
 Eremochloa bimaculata Hack. - Guizhou, Hubei, Sichuan, Yunnan, Cambodia, Myanmar, New Guinea, Thailand, Vietnam, Queensland, New South Wales, Victoria
 Eremochloa ciliaris (L.) Merr. - Fujian, Guangdong, Guangxi, Guizhou, Hainan, Taiwan, Yunnan, Cambodia, Indonesia, Laos, Malaysia, Myanmar, New Guinea, Philippines, Thailand, Vietnam, Queensland
 Eremochloa ciliatifolia Hack. - Myanmar, Thailand, Vietnam
 Eremochloa eriopoda C.E.Hubb. -  Indochina, Sulawesi
 Eremochloa lanceolata Buit. - Thailand
 Eremochloa maxwellii Veldkamp - Thailand
 Eremochloa muricata (Retz.) Hack. - Guangdong, Myanmar, Thailand, Vietnam, Sri Lanka, Tamil Nadu
 Eremochloa ophiuroides (Munro) Hack. - Anhui, Fujian, Guangdong, Guangxi, Guizhou, Hainan, Henan, Hubei, Hunan, Jiangsu, Jiangxi, Sichuan, Taiwan, Zhejiang, Vietnam
 Eremochloa pectinata Buit. - India, Sri Lanka
 Eremochloa petelotii Merr. - Thailand, Vietnam, Cambodia
 Eremochloa renvoizei Traiperm & Boonkerd - Vietnam
 Eremochloa zeylanica (Trimen) Hack. - Yunnan, Guangxi, Sri Lanka, Andaman Islands

References

Andropogoneae
Poaceae genera